, also known by his Chinese style name , was a bureaucrat of Ryukyu Kingdom.

He was the sixth head of the aristocrat family called Kunigami Udun. He was sent to Kagoshima as a hostage in 1614. Heard about the Siege of Osaka broke out, he requested to join the army, and received permission of Shimazu Iehisa. He wore wafuku and changed his name to Kunigami Samanokami, and received weapons from Iehisa. Before he arrived the battlefield, the war ended. He sailed back to Ryukyu in 1616.

References

1591 births
1635 deaths
People of the Ryukyu Kingdom
Aji (Ryukyu)
Ryukyuan people
17th-century Ryukyuan people